San Andrés Huayapam  is a town and municipality in Oaxaca in south-western Mexico. The municipality covers an area of 14.03 km². 
It is part of the Centro District in the Valles Centrales region.
Huayapam makes up part of the IV Federal Electoral District of Oaxaca.
As of 2005, the municipality had a total population of 4,508.
The municipality includes part of the Benito Juárez National Park.

References

Municipalities of Oaxaca